The 2005–06 Lebanese Second Division was the 72nd season of the Second Division league which featured 12 Clubs. 3 of these teams were eligible for promotion to the top league of Lebanese football, the Lebanese Premier League while 1 of the 12 teams had to face relegation to the Lebanese Third Division for the 2006–07 Season.

From the 2004–05 Football League, 3 teams were relegated to the Second Division. However, 2 teams were brought up to the Football League from the 2004–05 Second Division, these 2 teams being Salam Zgharta and Racing Beirut. This was due to the Lebanese Football Federation announcing it will reduce the number of teams in the Football League from 11 to 10 for the 2005–06 Season leading to an increase in the number of teams in the Second Division.

At the end of the season, Shabab Al-Sahel earned the title after finishing on 56 Points, 5 clear of the nearest club, Al-Hikma who finished 2nd on 51 Points with 16 victories, 3 draws and just 3 losses for the Season. The last team in this season to earn promotion was the
Al-Ahli Sidon team who finished 3rd and just 1 point behind Al-Hikma.

Final table

Top scorers

Relegation/Promotion

Relegation from Football League from 2005–06 Season
Racing Beirut

Promotion to Football League from 2005–06 Season
Shabab Al-Sahel
Hekmeh FC
Al-Ahli Saida

Relegation to Third Division from the 2005–06 Season
Al Egtmaaey Tripoli

References

External links
Rec.Sports.Soccer.Statistics.Foundation Website
RSSSF summary of 06/07 Season
Lebanese Football.com
Goalzz.com Website

Lebanese Second Division seasons
Leb
2005–06 in Lebanese football